Pucker is a 2013 album by jazz drummer Scott Amendola and guitarist Charlie Hunter. It's the second of the pair's albums as co-leaders, following the Hunter-fronted Not Getting Behind Is the New Getting Ahead; this time, Amendola receives top billing and the majority of the song credits.

Track listing
All songs written by Scott Amendola except where noted.

"Leave On" – 4:18
"Pucker" – 2:38
"Deep Eyes" – 5:03
"Tiny Queen" – 5:28
"Scott's Tune" (Tony Gottuso) – 4:38
"Rubbed Out" – 4:48
"Sharp Tooth" – 3:38
"The Mighty" – 5:26
"Buffalo Bird Women" – 4:47

Personnel 
 Charlie Hunter – seven-string guitar, producer
 Scott Amendola – drums, producer

References

2013 albums
Charlie Hunter albums
Blues albums by American artists